Killerby is a village in the borough of Darlington and the ceremonial county of County Durham, England. It is situated a few miles to the west of Darlington. At the 2011 Census the population was less than 100. Details are maintained in the parish of Staindrop.

In the Imperial Gazetteer of England and Wales (1870–72) John Marius Wilson described Killerby:

References

External links

Villages in County Durham
Places in the Borough of Darlington
Places in the Tees Valley